Zaoyuan Subdistrict is a subdistrict in Baota District, Yan'an, Shaanxi Province, China. The subdistrict had a population of 15,835 as of 2010.

History 

Zaoyuan hosted the Secretariat of the Chinese Communist Party from October 1943 to March 1947.

In 1972, the Zaoyuan People's Commune was established, as part of the nationwide campaign of establishing people's communes. When people's communes were abolished in 1984, Zaoyuan was re-designated as a township.

In 1998, Zaoyuan was upgraded from a township to a town.

In June 2015, the Shaanxi Ministry of Civil Affairs upgraded Zaoyuan from a town to a subdistrict.

Geography 

Administrative divisions 
Zaoyuan Subdistrict administers 2 residential communities and 12 administrative villages.

 Zaoyuan Community
 Peizhuang Community
 Zaoyuan Village
 Yangya Village
 Houjiagou Village
 Peizhuang Village
 Suancigou Village
 Zhangtianhe Village
 Miaogou Village
 Mojiawan Village
 Shangbiangou Village
 Yandianze Village
 Wenjiagou Village
 Xiabiangou Village

Demographics 
Per the 2010 Chinese Census, Zaoyuan had a population of 15,835. This is up from the 14,363 recorded in the 2000 Chinese Census, and a 1996 estimate of 7,000.

Transportation 
The G65 Baotou–Maoming Expressway runs through the subdistrict, as do Shaanxi Provincial Highways 206 and 303.

See also 
 List of township-level divisions of Shaanxi

References 

Township-level divisions of Shaanxi
Subdistricts of the People's Republic of China
Baota District
History of the Chinese Communist Party